Bjørnar Neteland (born 20 May 1991) is a Norwegian alpine ski racer. He competes in Super G, Giant slalom and Combined. He competed at the 2017 World Championships in St. Moritz, Switzerland, where he placed 25th in the Super-G.

References

External links
 
 

1991 births
Sportspeople from Bergen
Norwegian male alpine skiers
Living people